Haggis is a Scottish dish.

Haggis or variations may also refer to:

Haggis (card game), shedding card game
HAGGIS, programming language
Israel Haggis (1811–1849), English cricketer
Paul Haggis, Canadian film director

See also
Wild haggis, fictional creature in Scottish folklore